Paulina Maj-Erwardt ( Maj, born 22 March 1987) is a Polish volleyball player, who plays as a libero. She was part of the Polish team that came third at the 2009 Women's European Volleyball Championship and the 2009 Summer Universiade. She currently plays for KPS Chemik Police.

Domestic career
Maj-Erwadt has played in Poland for her entire career. Between 2005 and 2008, she played for BKS Bielsko-Biała, and later played for PTPS Piła, Atom Trefl Sopot, Muszynianka Muszyna, KPS Chemik Police, and Budowlani Łódź. Maj-Erwardt took time away from the sport for the birth of her child. She returned for the 2018–2019 season, playing for BKS Bielsko-Biała, in a second stint for the club. For the 2019–20 season, Maj-Erwardt signed for KPS Chemik Police. She was the fifth best receiver in the 2019–20 season, and resigned for Chemik Police for the 2020–21 season.

International career
Maj-Erwadt has made 108 appearances for the Poland national team. Maj was part of the Polish team that came third at the 2009 Women's European Volleyball Championship, and came third in the women's volleyball event at the 2009 Summer Universiade. She was named the tournament's sixth best libero. She represented Poland in qualifying for the 2012 and 2016 Summer Olympics. She played at the 2019 Montreux Volley Masters

References

External links
 Tauron Liga

1987 births
Living people
People from Złotów
Polish women's volleyball players
Medalists at the 2009 Summer Universiade
Universiade medalists in volleyball
Universiade bronze medalists for Poland